Fora da Grei (Portuguese for Outside the Flock) is the debut album by the Brazilian musician Rogério Skylab, self-released in 1992 and the musician's only album to come out in vinyl format. Its title is intended to be a pun on the Portuguese-language term "fora da lei" ("outlaw").

The track "Naquela Noite" would be re-recorded for his next release, Skylab. "Blues do Para-Choque" was re-recorded for Skylab III, "Casas da Banha" for Skylab VIII and "Palavras São Voláteis" for Melancolia e Carnaval.

The album can be downloaded for free on Skylab's official website.

Background
Prior to the album's release, Rogério Skylab (stage name of Rogério Tolomei Teixeira), a graduate in literature and philosophy from the Federal University of Rio de Janeiro, worked as a bank officer at a Banco do Brasil agency; even though he had performed with a short-lived punk rock group, Setembro Negro, during the mid- to late 1980s, Skylab once claimed that he originally never thought about pursuing a career as a musician, instead wanting to dedicate himself to literature or becoming a teacher.

In 1991, "just for fun", Skylab travelled to Juiz de Fora, Minas Gerais, to partake at a well-known music festival which used to be held there. His entry, "Samba do Skylab" (from which he subsequently took his stage name), won the festival's first-place cash prize. He then used the money to finance the production of Fora da Grei. Despite the album's "dismal production", since "at the time independent records in Brazil were like aliens" in Skylab's words, the album was critically acclaimed to the point of even being considered one of the best of the year by the Jornal do Brasil, and the musician was invited many times by Jô Soares to promote it on his late-night talk shows, Jô Soares Onze e Meia and later the Programa do Jô, what would effectively launch his musical career. However, Skylab wouldn't work on a follow-up until 1999, when he released his first of ten eponymous albums.

Track listing
All tracks are written by Rogério Skylab.

Personnel
 Rogério Skylab – vocals
 Alexandre Guichard – charango, mandolin, ten-string guitar
 Raimundo Nicioli – keyboards
 João Ataíde – bass guitar, production
 Edson Cortes, Don Fla – percussion
 Ayrton Seixas Jr. – cover art
 Adriano Raimundo – photography
 Tita Albuquerque – mixing
 Ricardo Misutani – mastering
 Marcos Petrilo – executive production

References

1992 debut albums
Rogério Skylab albums
Self-released albums
Obscenity controversies in music
Albums free for download by copyright owner